Nana was, according to a falsified charter dated to 1135, bishop of Pécs in the Kingdom of Hungary. Although the charter itself was not authentic, its compiler plausibly used an original charter from the same period. Therefore, the existence of a bishop of Pécs named Nana in the 1130s can be accepted. All the same, Nana only administered his diocese for one or two years, because his successor is mentioned for the first time in 1136.

References
 Koszta, László (2009). Nána (1135). In: A Pécsi Egyházmegye története I: A középkor évszázadai (1009–1543) (Szerkesztette: Fedeles Tamás, Sarbak Gábor, Sümegi József), p. 65. ("A History of the Diocese of Pécs, Volume I: Medieval Centuries, 1009–1543; Edited by Tamás Fedeles, Gábor Sarbak and József Sümegi"); Fény Kft.; Pécs; .

12th-century Roman Catholic bishops in Hungary
Bishops of Pécs
12th-century Hungarian people